Artocarpus teysmannii, also known as cempedak air in Malay and  as tilap in Indonesia, is a species of flowering plant, a fruit tree in the fig family, that is native to Southeast Asia.

Description
The species grows as a monoecious tree to 45 m in height, with a bole of up to 7 m, small buttresses, and with white latex. The oval leaves are 15–35 cm long by 5–17 cm wide. The globular inflorescences occur in the leaf axils. The fruits are cylindrical or oblong syncarpous infructescences, 8.5–12 cm by 3–6 cm in diameter, covered by short, flexible, conical spines, and ripening brownish-yellow. The seeds are covered by an edible, sweet, white aril.

Distribution and habitat
The species is found in the Malay Peninsula, Borneo, Sumatra, Sulawesi, the Sulu Archipelago and New Guinea, where it occurs naturally in lowland and hill mixed dipterocarp forest, as well as in swamp forest, up to an elevation of 1,000 m.

References

 
teysmannii
Flora of Malesia
Fruits originating in Asia
Plants described in 1861
Taxa named by Friedrich Anton Wilhelm Miquel